The following list includes all current and former arenas used by the Basketball Africa League (BAL). Other information included in this list are arena locations, seating capacities, years opened, and in use.

Under the league's current format, the league announces the host arenas prior to the season. The BAL initially announced seven venues for the inaugural 2021 season, however, all games were played in one venue due to the COVID-19 pandemic. In the following season, the BAL expanded to two more arenas. The BAL plans to play different stages of the regular season conferences in different arenas.

Arenas

References 

Basketball Africa League